Saint-Pabu is a commune in the Finistère department of Brittany in north-western France.

Population
Inhabitants of Saint-Pabu are called in French Saint-Pabusiens.

Toponymy
The name Pabu comes from one of the names of Saint Tugdual.

Breton language
The municipality launched a linguistic plan concerning the Breton language through Ya d'ar brezhoneg on 14 January 2006.

See also
 Communes of the Finistère department

References

External links

 Official website 
Mayors of Finistère Association 

Communes of Finistère